The following tables compare notable reference management software. The comparison includes older applications that may no longer be supported, as well as actively-maintained software.

General 

In the "notes" section, there is a difference between:
 web-based, referring to applications that may be installed on a web server (usually requiring MySQL or another database and PHP, Perl, Python, or some other language for web applications)
 a centrally hosted website

Operating system support 
In the case of web applications, this describes the server OS. For centrally hosted websites that are proprietary, this is not applicable. Any client OS can connect to a web service unless stated otherwise in a footnote.

Export file formats 
This table lists the machine-readable file formats that can be exported from reference managers. These are typically used to share data with other reference managers or with other people who use a reference manager. To exchange data from one program to another, the first program must be able to export to a format that the second program may import. Import file formats are in a table below this one.

Import file formats 
This table lists the file formats which may be manually imported into the reference managers without needing to connect to one particular database. Many of these database companies use the same name for their file format as they do for their database (including Copac, CSA, ISI, Medline, Ovid, PubMed, and SciFinder). For the ability to retrieve citations from the particular databases (rather than the file format), please refer to the database connectivity table that is below this table.

, CSL YAML is not supported by any reference management system.

Citation styles

Reference list file formats 

Endnote is incompatible with LaTeX. Among other things, it does not provide for robust citation keys.

Word processor integration 
Some reference management software include support for automatic embedding and (re)formatting of references in word processing programs. This table lists this type of support for Microsoft Word, Pages, Apache OpenOffice / LibreOffice Writer, the LaTeX editors Kile and LyX, and Google Docs. Other programs are able to scan RTF or other textual formats for inserted placeholders which are subsequently formatted. Most reference management programs support copy/paste or drag-and-drop of references into any editor, but this is not meant here.

Database connectivity 
This table lists the academic databases and search engines which reference managers can import from. In some cases, a search and retrieval can be conducted directly in the reference manager. In others, a bookmarklet or Firefox extension will allow a site to be scraped.

Password "protection" and network versions
Some reference managers provide network functionality. (N/A means the product has no networking, while "no" indicates it does (but lacks an implemented feature).)

Discontinued software

Notes

References

Bibliography 
 
 
 
 

Reference
Reference management software